The following is a list of notable deaths in November 2001.

Entries for each day are listed alphabetically by surname. A typical entry lists information in the following sequence:
 Name, age, country of citizenship at birth, subsequent country of citizenship (if applicable), reason for notability, cause of death (if known), and reference.

November 2001

1
Juan Emilio Bosch Gaviño, 92, Dominican politician, historian, writer, and the first president of the Dominican Republic.
Solange Chaput-Rolland, 82, Canadian journalist, author, and politician.
Tom Cheney, 67, American Major League Baseball player.
Petro Jacyk, 80, Canadian entrepreneur and philanthropist.
JP Miller, 81, American writer, pneumonia.
Bob Woodruff, 85, American college football player, coach, and sports administrator.

2
Gordie Byers, 71, Canadian ice hockey player.
Tom Dardis, 78, American author and editor (Avon Books, Berkley Publishing Corporation).
Mona Fandey, 45, Malaysian pop singer and convicted murderer, executed.
Hank Gremminger, 68, American professional football player (Baylor, Green Bay Packers, Los Angeles Rams), cardiac arrest.
Doug Hele, 82, British motorcycle engineer.
Chen-Yuan Lee, 85, Taiwanese pharmacologist and political activist.
Elazar Shach, 102, Lithuanian Haredi rabbi.
Buddy Starcher, 95, American country singer.
William Whitlock, 83, British politician.

3
Evan Adermann, 74, Australian politician.
Luis Alfredo Arango, 65, Guatemalan poet.
Denis Gallagher, 79, Irish politician.
Sir Ernst Gombrich, 92, Austrian-born British art historian.
Champ Hood, 49, American singer and multi-instrumentalist, cancer.
Epifanio “Fano” Irizarry, 86, Puerto Ricanpainter  and art professor.
Carol Rubin, 56, American film producer.
Ward Wood, 77, American actor (Mannix) and television writer.

4
Arthur Guepe, 86, American football player and coach.
Nikolai Vladimirovich Astakhov, 79, Soviet/Russian scientist and professor.
Edward Boland, 90, American politician.
Peter Coyne, 84, Australian politician.
Bob Gillespie, 82, American baseball player.
Amalie Rothschild, 85, American artist.
Paul R. Screvane, 87, American politician, congestive heart failure.
Inocencia Solis, 68, Filipino sprinter.
Ng Eng Teng, 67, Singaporean sculptor.

5
Gholam Reza Azhari, 89, Prime Minister of Iran and military leader, cancer.
Andrew Bagby, 28, American doctor and murder victim whose killing was documented in the movie: Dear Zachary
Milan D. Bish, 72, American diplomat (Ambassador of the United States to Barbados, Dominica, St Lucia, Antigua, and St. Vincent).
Roy Boulting, 87, English filmmaker.
Harcharan Chawla, 75, Indian writer.
Ervin Conradt, 85, American politician and farmer.
Milton William Cooper, 58, American conspiracy theorist, radio broadcaster, and author, shot.
Barry Horne, 49, English animal rights activist, liver failure after hunger strike.
Joan Marion, 93, British stage, film and television actress.

6
Shepard Broad, 95, Belarusian-American banker, lawyer, and philanthropist.
Terry D. Clark, 45, American convicted murderer, execution by lethal injection.
Don Lavoie, 50, American economist, stroke.
Sveto Letica, 75, Croatian admiral.
Gray Morrow, 67, American comic book artist and book illustrator.
Peter Kenneth Newman, 73, English economist and historian of economic thought.
Anthony Shaffer, 75, English playwright (Sleuth), screenwriter and novelist.
Ralph Wenzel, 83, American gridiron football player and United States Marine Corps officer.
John Simon White, 61, Austrian-born American opera director.

7
Shahed Ali, 76, Bangladeshi educationist, cultural activist and an author.
Kamala Bahuguna, 77, Indian politician.
Bobby Bass, 65, American stunt performer.
Nida Blanca, 65, Filipino actress, stabbed.
Delia Garcés, 82, Argentine film actress.
Brian Henderson, 71, English footballer.
Sachiko Hidari, 71, Japanese film actress.
Geoffrey Jenkins, 81, South African writer.
Ivan Neill, 95, British Army officer and Unionist politician.
Alta Schrock, 90, American biology professor and community activist.

8
Paolo Bertoli, 93, Italian cardinal, Camerlengo of the Holy Roman Church.
Anno Birkin, 20, English poet and musician, road accident.
Valentin Eduque, 74, Filipino basketball coach and player.
Harold Fisch, 78, British-Israeli author, literary critic, and diplomat, tumor.
Albrecht Fröhlich, 85, German-British mathematician.
Monique Harvey, 51, Canadian painter, cancer.
Malak Karsh, 86, Canadian photographer.
Richard Kim, 83, American martial artist.
Peter Laslett, 85, British historian.
Patrick Quinlan, Irish academic and politician.
Lidia Zavadsky, 64, Israeli visual artist, cancer.

9
Denis Atkinson, 75, Barbadian cricketer, captain of West Indies.
Nancye Wynne Bolton, 84, Australian tennis player.
Dorothy Dunnett, 78, Scottish historical novelist.
Koichi Chiba, 70, Japanese voice actor and sound director.
Ethel D. Jacobs, 91, American Thoroughbred racehorse owner/breeder, pneumonia.
Niels Jannasch, 77, German-Canadian marine historian and the founding director of the Maritime Museum of the Atlantic.
Giovanni Leone, 93, Italian politician, Prime Minister (1963;1968) and President (1971–1978).

10
Theys Eluay, 64, Indonesian independence activist for West Papuan, assassinated.
Mariya Havrysh, 70, Soviet-Ukrainian Olympic swimmer (women's 200-metre breaststroke at the 1952 Summer Olympics).
Ken Kesey, 66, American author and counter-cultural figure.
Michael Lucas, 2nd Baron Lucas of Chilworth, 75, British politician.
Enid McElwee, 87, New Zealand fencer.
Junji Nishime, 80, Japanese politician.

11
John R. Foley, 84, American politician (U.S. Representative for Maryland's 6th congressional district from 1959 to 1961).
Leon Gray, 49, American professional football player (Jackson State, New England Patriots, Houston Oilers, New Orleans Saints).
Sir Denis Spotswood, 85, British Chief of the Air Staff (1971–1974)
Emmanuel Blayo Wakhweya, 64, Ugandan politician and economist, cardiac arrest.
Journalists killed in the Dasht-e Qaleh Taliban ambush
Pierre Billaud, 31, French radio reporter and journalist.
Volker Handloik, 40, German freelance journalist and reporter.
Johanne Sutton, 34, French radio reporter and journalist.

12
Bert Axell, 86, British naturalist and conservationist.
Carrie Donovan, 73, American fashion editor (Vogue, Harper's Bazaar, The New York Times Magazine).
Albert Hague, 81, German-American composer (Redhead, How the Grinch Stole Christmas) and actor (Fame, Space Jam).
Ashot Melikjanyan, 49, Soviet/Armenian actor, plane crash.
Tony Miles, 46, English chess Grandmaster, heart failure.
Prekshya Shah, 48, Nepalese princess, helicopter crash.
Sivaya Subramuniyaswami, 74, American Saivite guru.
Zorita, 86, American burlesque dancer.

13
Karuna Banerjee, 81, Indian actress.
Robert C. Eckhardt, 88, American politician (U.S. Representative for Texas's 8th congressional district from 1967 to 1981).
Panama Francis, 82, American swing jazz drummer, stroke.
Marius Flothuis, 87, Dutch composer, musicologist and music critic.
Sam Maple, 48, American jockey in Thoroughbred horse racing, cancer.
Frank Messer, 76, American sportscaster.
Peggy Mount, 86, English actress (Oliver!, The Princess and the Goblin).
Mayzod Reid, 73, New Zealand diver.
Ray Robinson, 61, English cricketer.
Cornelius Warmerdam, 86, American pole vaulter.

14
Seth Benardete, 71, American classicist and philosopher.
Charlotte Coleman, 33, British actress (Four Weddings and a Funeral), bronchial asthma attack.
Juan Carlos Lorenzo, 79, Argentine football player and coach.
Zigu Ornea, 71, Romanian literary critic, biographer and book publisher, failed surgery.
Nathan M. Pusey, 94, American university educator.
Herbert Tauss, 72, American artist, illustrator, and painter.
Hugh Verity, 83, British Royal Air Force fighter pilot during World War II.

15
Geoffrey Blodgett, 70, American historian.
Megan Boyd, 86, British fly tyer.
Edwin H. Colbert, 96, American paleontologist, researcher and author.
Herbert Feith, 71, Australian academic and scholar.
Loyal Garner, 55, American Hawaiian musician ("Lady of Love").
Satoru Kobayashi, 71, Japanese film director, bladder cancer.
Lewis Render Morgan, 88, American judge.
Lucile Eleanor St. Hoyme, 77, American biological anthropologist.
Ernie Stewart, 92, American baseball umpire.
Laurence Thursting, 86, English cricketer.

16
Tal Abernathy, 80, American baseball player.
Rosemary Brown, 85, British composer and spiritualist.
Tommy Flanagan, 71, American jazz pianist, brain aneurysm.
Montague Jayawickrama, 90, Sri Lankan politician.
Eric Jolliffe, 94, Australian cartoonist and illustrator.
Clifford A. Jones, 89, American politician.
Edgar Ross, 95, Australian journalist and communist.
Isaac Scott, 56, American guitarist and singer.
Red Steiner, 86, American baseball player.

17
Irving Crane, 88, American pool player.
John M. Dawson, 71, American computational physicist and the father of plasma-based acceleration techniques.
Jerry Jerome, 89, American jazz and big band tenor saxophonist (Glenn Miller, Red Norvo, Benny Goodman, Artie Shaw).
Michael Karoli, 53, German guitarist, singer, violinist and cellist (Can).
Shu Shien-Siu, 89, Chinese/Taiwanese mathematician and engineer.
Lendon Smith, 80, American pediatrician, author, and television personality.
Billy Vessels, 70, American football player.
Harrison A. Williams, 81, American politician.

18
Seyed Khalil Alinezhad, 43, Iranian tanbur player, murdered and burnt.
Mel Deutsch, 86, American baseball player.
Walter Matuszczak, 83, American football player.
Malcolm McFee, 52, English actor, cancer.
Stuart Nagel, 67, American academic, suicide.
Uttamrao Patil, 80, Indian politician.
Ela Peroci, 79, Slovene children's book writer.
Harriette Tarler, 81, American film actress.

19
Baghdasar Arzoumanian, 85, Armenian architect and designer.
Roland Beamont, 81, British fighter pilot for the Royal Air Force.
John Farnsworth Wright, 72, British economist.
Marcelle Ferron, 77, Canadian Québécoise artist and a member of Les Automatistes.
Bagrat Ulubabyan, 75, Armenian writer and historian.
Journalists killed in the Pul-i-Estikam bridge ambush
Harry Burton, 33, Australian journalist and cameraman.
Maria Grazia Cutuli, 39, Italian journalist.
Julio Fuentes, 46, Spanish war correspondent.
Aziz Ullah Haidari, 33, Pakistani correspondent and photo-journalist.

20
James Broad, 43, American heavyweight boxer
Kassi Manlan, 53, Côte d'Ivoire World Health Organization aid worker, murdered.
Borko Temelkovski, 81, Macedonian politician and communist leader.

21
Ralph Burns, 79, American jazz pianist, composer, and arranger, complications of a stroke and pneumonia.
Fritz Herzog, 98, German-American mathematician.
Seydou Keïta, Malian photographer.
Gardner McKay, 69, American actor (Adventures in Paradise), artist and author.
Vladimir Pasechnik, 64, Soviet bioweaponeer and defector.
Salahuddin of Selangor, 77, Malaysian king (11th Yang di-Pertuan Agong of Malaysia and 8th Sultan of Selangor).
Seymour Reit, 83, American children's author.
Paddy Skerritt, 75, Irish golfer.
Mahmud Taghiyev, 78, Azerbaijani painter.

22
Mary Kay Ash, 83, American businesswoman, founder of Mary Kay Cosmetics.
Theo Barker, 78, British social and economic historian.
Norman Granz, 83, American jazz music impresario and record producer.
Ronald Cuthbert Hay, 85, British Royal Marine fighter ace.
Gudivada Gurunadha Rao, 46, Indian politician and social activists, kidney failure.
Luis Santaló, 90, Spanish mathematician.

23
Vendramino Bariviera, 64, Italian racing cyclist.
Bo Belinsky, 64, American baseball player.
Maria Teresa Carlson, 38, Filipino-American actress and beauty queen, murdered.
Dionisio Foianini, 98, Bolivian politician and businessman.
David McClintock, 88, English botanist, horticulturist and author.
O. C. Smith, 69, American singer ("Little Green Apples").
Gerhard Stoltenberg, 73, German politician and minister.
Mary Whitehouse, 91, British campaigner against permissiveness.

24
Tommy Gallacher, 79, Scottish football player.
Rachel Gurney, 81, British actress (Upstairs, Downstairs).
Robert Helps, 73, American concert pianist and composer.
Jacob Landau, 83, American artist.
Donald McPherson, 56, Canadian figure skater, complications from diabetes.
Princess Sophie of Greece and Denmark, 87, European royalty, sister of Prince Philip.
Melanie Thornton, 34, American singer, plane crash.
William Woodfield, 73, American photographer, and television screenwriter and producer, heart failure.

25
Alan Bray, 53, British historian and gay rights activist.
Harry Devlin, 83, American artist, painter and magazine cartoonist (Collier's).
David Gascoyne, 85, English poet (Surrealist movement).
George Mock, 94, American labor leader.
Douglas Morton, 85, Canadian soldier, politician, and judge.
Jean-Louis Palladin, 55, French-born American chef.
Michael Rogin, 64, American political scientist.
N. C. Sippy, 75, Indian film producer and director.
Johnny Micheal Spann, 32, American operations officer in the C.I.A., K.I.A.

26
Sam Claphan, 45, American gridiron football player, heart attack.
Regine Hildebrandt, 60, German biologist and politician (Social Democratic Party of Germany), breast cancer.
Terry King, 40, American murder victim, bludgeoning.
Joe Modise, 72, South African political activist.
Ulf Strömberg, Swedish cameraman, rifle shots.
Nils-Aslak Valkeapää, 58, Finnish-Sami writer, musician (performed at the opening ceremony of the 1994 Winter Olympic Games) and artist.
Kim Young-moo, 57, South Korean poet and literary critic, cancer.

27
Ray Frankowski, 82, American professional football player (Green Bay Packers, Los Angeles Dons).
Gordon Freeth, 87, Australian politician (House of Representatives) and diplomat (Japan, United Kingdom).
Fei-Ping Hsu, 51, Chinese-American pianist.
Harry Sternberg, 97, American painter and printmaker.
Joe Hin Tjio, 82, American cytogeneticist.
Jane Welsh, 96, British actress.

28
Norman Lumsden, 95, British opera singer and actor, shingles infection.
Kal Mann, 84, American lyricist ("Teddy Bear", "Butterfly", "Let's Twist Again").
William Reid, 79, Scottish World War II bomber pilot and war hero (Victoria Cross).
Michael Yates, 82, British television designer.

29
Viktor Astafyev, 77, Soviet and Russian writer.
Usman Awang, 72, Malaysian poet, playwright, and novelist, heart attack.
Budd Boetticher, 85, American film director (seven westerns starring Randolph Scott).
Pauline Campanelli, 58, American artist and writer.
Mic Christopher, 32, Irish singer-songwriter, accidental fall.
Carol Goodner, 97, American actress.
George Harrison, 58, British musician and former member of The Beatles.
John Knowles, 75, American author, A Separate Peace.
Marcelino Lopez, 58, Cuban-American baseball player.
John Mitchum, 82, American character actor (Dirty Harry series, Telefon, F Troop).
Priya Munasinghe, 60, Sri Lankan racing driver champion.
Erwin Thaler, 71, Austrian Olympic bobsledder (silver medal for the four-man bobsled: 1964 Winter Olympics, 1968 Winter Olympics).

30
Lawrence Coughlin, 72, American lawyer and politician (U.S. Representative for Pennsylvania's 13th congressional district, 1969–1993), cancer.
Ernst Hufschmid, 88, Swiss footballer.
Pappy Sherrill, 86, American Old Time and Bluegrass fiddler.
Walt Zirinsky, 81, American football player.

References 

2001-11
 11